Department of Military Affairs (DMA) is the department in charge of military matters within the Indian Ministry of Defence. Headed by the Chief of Defence Staff, as its ex-officio secretary, the DMA provides integration between the armed forces of the Union and the Ministry of Defence.

Function
Consisting of military and civilian officers, the DMA will promote jointness in various areas such as procurement, training and staffing. The DMA will deal the tri-service Integrated Defence Staff (IDS) Headquarters, with the headquarters of three armed force Army, Air and Naval, the Territorial Army and certain procurement requirements. DMA will also deal with promoting jointness through joint planning, facilitate restructuring for optimal utilisation of resources and promote the use of indigenous equipment by the Services. The DMA, being under the Chief of Defence Staff will also deal with the role and responsibilities assigned to the chief.

As per the Second Schedule to Government of India (Allocation of Business) Rules 1961, the following subjects were allocated to DMA:-

 The Armed Forces of the Union, namely, Army, Navy and Air Force.
 Integrated Headquarters of the Ministry of Defence comprising Army Headquarters, Naval Headquarters, Air Headquarters and Defence Staff Headquarters.
 The Territorial Army.
 Works relating to Army, Navy and Air Force.
 Procurement exclusive to the Services except capital acquisitions, as per prevalent rules and procedures.
 Promoting jointness in procurement, training and staffing for the Services through joint planning and integration of their requirements.
 Facilitation of restructuring of Military Commands for optimal utilisation of resources by bringing about jointness in operations, including through establishment of joint / theatre commands.
 Promoting use of indigenous equipment by the Services.

Organisation 
The department comes under the Ministry of Defence and is headed by the Chief of Defence Staff, who acts as its ex-officio secretary. In addition to the Chief of Defence Staff, the department comprises an additional secretary, five joint secretaries, thirteen deputy secretaries, and twenty-five under-secretaries.

References

Notes

Citations 

2019 establishments in India
Government agencies established in 2019
Military units and formations of India
Military units and formations established in 2019
Joint military units and formations of India
Ministry of Defence (India)